"Just Kickin' It" is a song by American R&B group Xscape. Written by Jermaine Dupri and Manuel Seal, 
the song was released as Xscape's first single from the group's 1993 debut album, Hummin' Comin' at 'Cha. The single became the group's most commercially successful hit, peaking at number two on the Billboard Hot 100 and spending four weeks at number one on the Hot R&B Singles chart.

Composition
"Just Kickin' It" is an urban ballad in which vocals are the focus, and the instrumental foundation is otherwise sparse. 
Jermaine Dupri, who according to his father, Columbia Records executive Michael Mauldin, wanted Xscape to be "the ghetto En Vogue,"
originally wrote the song as a summary of what men wanted from women. The lyrics were considered controversial by some female fans who believed the song's message was sexist. Former group member LaTocha Scott, however, dismissed the critics. "I've heard some females say that the song is unreal and that they can tell it was written by a man, but I don't think it makes it sexist. Shoot, everybody knows a man wants a woman who can cook."

Release and reception
Released on August 13, 1993, "Just Kickin' It" entered the Billboard Hot 100 chart at number 90 and reached the top 10 in four weeks. The song peaked at number two in October, spending a total of 17 weeks in the top 40. 
The single reached number one on the Hot R&B Singles chart, where it spent four weeks at the top. The song also spent one week at number one on the Hot 100 Singles Sales chart. In November, the single was certified platinum in the United States and has since been certified double-platinum in March 2023. "Just Kickin' It" also peaked at number 22 in New Zealand and number 49 in the United Kingdom. The song earned the band a Soul Train Music Awards nomination in 1994, though they lost to H-Town's single "Knockin' Da Boots" in the Best R&B New Artist category.

Charts

Weekly charts

Year-end charts

Certifications

See also
 List of number-one R&B singles of 1993 (U.S.)

References

External links
 "Just Kickin' It" lyrics

1993 debut singles
1993 songs
Song recordings produced by Jermaine Dupri
Songs written by Jermaine Dupri
Songs written by Manuel Seal
Xscape (group) songs